Siberia is a 2020 psychological thriller film directed by Abel Ferrara. It was selected to compete for the Golden Bear in the main competition section at the 70th Berlin International Film Festival, where it premiered on 24 February 2020.

Premise
Clint, an English speaker, has abandoned his former life and now runs a bar in Siberia where most of the few guests do not speak English. He suffers from hallucinations and embarks on a dog-sled journey to a nearby cave where he confronts his dreams and memories, including of his father, brother, former wife and son, trying to make sense of his life.

Cast
 Willem Dafoe as Clint
 Dounia Sichov as wife
 Simon McBurney as magician
 Daniel Giménez Cacho as doctor
 Cristina Chiriac as Russian woman
 Anna Ferrara as Clint's son

Production
The film is the sixth collaboration between Ferrara and Dafoe. The film also features Ferrara's wife Cristina and daughter, Anna, who plays Clint's son.

The film was inspired by Carl Jung's The Red Book.

Release
The film had its world premiere at the 70th Berlin International Film Festival on 24 February 2020. It was released theatrically in Germany on 2 July 2020 by Port au Prince Pictures and in Italy on 20 August 2020 by Nexo Digital. In the United States, Siberia was released in select theaters and for digital rental on 18 June 2021 by Lionsgate.

Reception

Box office
Siberia grossed $23,626 in Italy.

Critical response
The site's critics consensus states, "Willem Dafoe delivers another outstanding performance in the central role, although it's undercut by Siberia frustratingly elliptical approach." On Metacritic, the film has a weighted average score of 56 out of 100, based on eight critics, indicating "mixed or average reviews". Guy Lodge of Variety called it a "beautiful, unhinged, sometimes hilarious trek into geographical and psychological wilderness that will delight some and mystify many others".

References

External links
 

2020 films
2020 psychological thriller films
English-language German films
English-language Italian films
English-language Mexican films
Films directed by Abel Ferrara
Films scored by Joe Delia
German psychological thriller films
Italian psychological thriller films
Mexican thriller films
2020s English-language films
2020s Mexican films